Poonam Sinha is an Indian politician and former actress, fashion model. She acted in Hindi cinema under the screen name Komal in her early career. She was crowned Miss Young India in 1968. She is married to actor and politician Shatrughna Sinha. She worked in lead roles in Hindi movies and has also produced two films.

Early life
Poonam was born in Hyderabad, in a Sindhi family as Poonam Chandiramani.

Career
She was credited as Komal in all her films as heroine, including  Jigri Dost, Dil Diwana and others. She was cast with Shatrughan Sinha in the movie Sabak (1973). The two later got married in 1980. They had earlier met in a train compartment while travelling.

After her marriage, she largely left her acting career to raise their children. After a long gap of thirty years, she starred in the film Jodhaa Akbar (2008) playing Mallika Hamida Banu Begum—mother of Emperor Akbar, enacted by Hrithik Roshan, directed by Ashutosh Gowariker.

Politics 
On 16 April 2019, she joined the Samajwadi Party, while her husband Shatrughan Sinha joined Indian National Congress after resigning from BJP. She lost the Loksabha election to Rajnath Singh from Lucknow (Lok Sabha constituency).

Personal life
She is married to actor-politician Shatrughan Sinha. They have twin sons, actors Luv Sinha and Kush Sinha, and a daughter, Bollywood actress Sonakshi Sinha. She lives with her husband and children in their Juhu bungalow, Ramayan.

Sonakshi had said she lives with her family due to her being a mommy/daddy's girl and that she has all the space she needs at her parents' house and that her apartment is more of a studio.

Filmography

References

External links

 
 

Indian film actresses
20th-century Indian actresses
Sindhi people
Indian people of Sindhi descent
Indian Hindus
Actresses in Hindi cinema
Actresses from Hyderabad, India
Living people
Indian women film producers
Film producers from Hyderabad, India
21st-century Indian actresses
1949 births
Businesswomen from Andhra Pradesh
Samajwadi Party politicians
Indian actor-politicians